= Nafis Nagar railway station =

Railway station in Pakistan

Nafees Nagar Railway Station

General information
- Owner: Ch.Anees Mehmood Ahmed Kahloon Ministry of Railways

Other information
- Station code: NFGR

History
- Former names: Great Indian Peninsula Railway

Nafees Nagar Railway Station (Urdu: نفس نگر ریلوے اسٹیشن) is located in Pakistan.

== See also ==
- List of railway stations in Pakistan
- Pakistan Railways
